Eleazar ben Kalir, also known as Eleazar HaKalir, Eleazar ben Killir or Eleazar Kalir (c. 570c. 640) was a Byzantine Jew and a Hebrew poet whose classical liturgical verses, known as piyut, have continued to be sung through the centuries during significant religious services, including those on Tisha B'Av and on the sabbath after a wedding. He was one of Judaism's earliest and most prolific of the paytanim (Hebrew liturgical poets). He wrote piyutim for all the main Jewish festivals, for special Sabbaths, for weekdays of festive character, and for the fasts. Many of his hymns have found their way into festive prayers of the Ashkenazi Jews' synagogal rite.

Biography
Although his poems have had a prominent place in printed ritual and he is known to have lived somewhere in the Near East, documentation regarding details of his life has been lost to history, including the exact year and circumstances of his birth and death. He is said to have been the disciple of another 6th-century composer of piyut, Yannai who, according to a certain legend, grew jealous of Eleazar's superior knowledge and caused his death by inserting into his shoe a scorpion whose sting proved to be fatal. Samuel David Luzzatto, however, dismisses this legend in light of the fact that Yannai's piyutim are still said. Luzzatto argues that if Yannai was a murderer then there is no way Yannai's piyutim would be so popular. Additionally, argues Luzzatto, Rabbi Gershom ben Judah mentions Yannai and uses honorific terms, something Rabbi Gershom would not have done if the legend is true.

In the acrostics of his hymns he usually signs his father's name, Kalir, but three times he writes Killir. In some of them, he adds the name of his city, Kirjath-sepher. Eleazar's name, home (Kirjath-sepher), and time have been the subject of many discussions in modern Jewish literature (Italy, Babylonia, Mesopotamia and Palestine have been claimed by different scholars as his native land), and some legends concerning his career have been handed down.

The Arukh derives the name "Kalir" from the Greek κόλλυρα = "a small cake," and reports that the poet obtained his name from a cake, inscribed with Biblical verses, which was given him to eat as a talisman for wisdom when he began to go to school. His scholarship having been attributed later to that talisman, he was called "Eleazar the Cake." While such a custom is known to have existed among the Jews and the Syriac Christians, others claim that the explanation put forward by the Arukh is not acceptable, since "Kalir" is not the name of the poet, but that of his father. Another interpretation holds that the name was derived from the poet's or his father's hometown: the Italian city Cagliari, Calais, Cologne, Kallirrhoe in Transjordan, or Edessa in Syria (F. Perles). Others see in it the Latin name "Celer" (J. Derenbourg). The city Kirjath-sepher has been identified with the biblical place in the Land of Israel of the same name (W. Heidenheim), with the Babylonian Sippara (Filosseno Luzzatto), and with Cagliari (Civitas Portus), in Italy.

The theory that he lived in Italy is based upon the premise that he wrote double Kerovot for the festivals; although Tosafot and Rosh assert that he did not write any for the second days.

His time has been set at different dates, from the second century, to the tenth or eleventh century. Based on Saadiah's Sefer ha-galuy, some place him in the 6th century. Older authorities consider him to have been a teacher of the Mishnah and identify him either with Eleazar ben Arach or with Eleazar ben Simeon He has been confounded with another poet by the name of Eleazar b. Jacob; and a book by the title of Kevod Adonai was ascribed to him by Moses Botarel.

The earliest references to Kalir seem to be in a responsum of Natronai Gaon (c. 853), in the "Yetzirah" commentary of Saadia Gaon, and in his "Agron", as well as in the writings of Al-Kirkisani.

Modern research points to the probability that he and his teacher were Palestinian Jews; and since Yannai is known to have been one of the halakhic authorities of Anan ben David (the alleged founder of Karaism), and must therefore have lived a considerable time earlier than Anan, Kalir's time may be fixed with some probability as the first half of the 7th century. From a linguistic point of view, it would seem that he lived in the Land of Israel at the end of the sixth century.

Kalir's hymns became an object of study and of Kabbalistic exegesis, as his personality was a mystery. It was related that heavenly fire surrounded him when he wrote the "Ve'hachayos" in Kedushah for Rosh Hashanah; that he himself ascended to heaven and there learned from the angels the secret of writing alphabetical hymns.

A peculiar development of the Kalir legend is seen in the story that Saadia found in Kalir's tomb a recipe for making "kame'ot" in the form of cakes. On a piyut found in Mahzor Vitry and ascribed by Brody to Kalir, see Max Weisz.

Poetic style
The "Kallir style" had a profound influence on the poets who succeeded him in Eretz Yisra'el and in the Near East. He made radical innovations in diction and style, while employing the full range of post-biblical Hebrew. It may be that the stories of Yannai growing jealous of him are based in fact, for the patterns of rhyme, acrostic, repetition, and refrain in his piyut are much more complex than those of his master.

His use of neologisms and other oddities has earned him a reputation as an enigmatic writer, to the point where some have criticized him for being obscure, and having a corruptive influence on the Hebrew language. He was, however, capable of writing in simple and direct language, as poems like his Epithalamium demonstrate.

Solomon Delmedigo warns the student against Kalir's writings because "he has cut up the Hebrew language in an arbitrary way".

Kalir was the first to embellish the entire liturgy with a series of hymns whose essential element was the aggadah. He drew his material from the Talmud, and from midrashic compilations, some of which latter are now probably lost, thus preserving some otherwise forgotten aggadic traditions. Kalir used the early "Hekalot Rabbati" of the Merkabah Riders, and traces of their mystic ideas and even of their language appear in his poetry. His language, however, is not that of his sources, but Biblical Hebrew, enriched with daring innovations. His predilection for rare words, allegorical expressions, and aggadic allusions make his writings hard to understand – some describe him as a "Hebrew version of Robert Browning". His linguistic peculiarities were followed by many a succeeding paytan; and they influenced to some extent even early prose, especially among the Karaites.

With the awakening of linguistic studies among the Jews and with the growing acquaintance of the latter with Arabic, his linguistic peculiarities were severely criticized (e.g., by Abraham ibn Ezra, a criticism which centuries later influenced the maskilim in their disparagement of Kalir); but the structure of his hymns remained a model which was followed for centuries after him and which received the name "Kaliric", (or "Kalliri").

Works
While some of his hymns have been lost, more than 200 of them appear in the Mahzorim. Twenty-odd of the kinot of Tisha B'Av were composed by him too.

Although most of Kalir's work remains unpublished, Shulamit Elizur has published two volumes of his poetry for Rosh Ha-Shanah and Yom Kippur respectively, and continues to work on his work.

Translations
Translations of some of his hymns into German are found in Zunz, in Sachs's edition of the prayer-book, and in Karpeles' Zionsharfe. Some have been rendered into English by Nina Davis and by Mrs. Henry Lucas. Some renderings of his poems may be found in the volumes of Davis & Adler's edition of the German Festival Prayers entitled Service of the Synagogue, as well as other holiday prayer books of the Ashkenazic rite with translations.  Additionally, the works that are recited in the Italian rite were translated into Italian by Rabbi Menachem Emanuel Hartom.

Commemoration
In Tel Aviv, Elazar HaKalir street near city hall is named after him. Likewise, in the Jerusalem neighborhood of Shaarei Chesed, a street is named after him.

See also
 Siddur

References

External links
 Safrai, Shemuel (2006). The Literature of the Sages {brief tribute to the accomplishments of Eleazar (Elazar) ben Killir}
KALLIR, ELEAZAR in the Jewish Virtual Library.

Hebrew-language poets
Byzantine Jews
7th-century Byzantine people
Jews and Judaism in the Byzantine Empire
570 births
640 deaths
Place of birth unknown
Date of death unknown
Place of death unknown
Date of birth unknown
7th-century Jews
7th-century poets